Spirobolellidae is a family of millipedes in the order Spirobolida. There are about 11 genera and more than 100 described species in Spirobolellidae.

Genera
These 11 genera belong to the family Spirobolellidae:
 Attemsobolus
 Desmocricellus Attems, 1953
 Howeobolus
 Hylekobolus Wesener, 2009
 Paraspirobolus Brölemann, 1902
 Physobolus Attems, 1936
 Poratobolus
 Queenslandobolus
 Spirobolellus Pocock, 1894
 Strophobolus
 Walesbolus Verhoeff, 1928

References

Further reading

 
 

Spirobolida
Millipedes of North America
Millipede families